Parategeticula pollenifera is a moth of the family Prodoxidae. It is found in pine-oak forests in south-western Arizona, south-western New Mexico and Veracruz (in Mexico).

The wingspan is 24–31 mm. Adults have relatively broad forewings with off-white and occasional dark scales. Females possess similar maxillary tentacles which are used to pick up pollen and to actively pollinate host flowers.

The larvae feed on Yucca schottii and Yucca elephantipes. Young larvae bore into the young fruit of their host plant and create a gall that replaces several seeds. When fully grown, they burrow into the soil, where pupation takes place. The larval diapause can last for at least two years.

References

Moths described in 1967
Prodoxidae
Moths of North America
Moths of Central America